The 1969–70 Irish Cup was the 90th edition of the premier knock-out cup competition in Northern Irish football. 

Linfield won the cup for the 30th time, defeating Ballymena United 2–1 in the final at Solitude.

The holders Ards were eliminated in the first round by Crusaders. To date, this was the final Irish Cup final to be held at Solitude.

Results

First round

|}

Replay

|}

Second replay

|}

Quarter-finals

|}

Replay

|}

Second replay

|}

Semi-finals

|}

Final

References

External links
The Rec.Sport.Soccer Statistics Foundation - Northern Ireland - Cup Finals

Irish Cup seasons
1969–70 in Northern Ireland association football
1969–70 domestic association football cups